Prosechen Island is the northern of two rocky islands in Smyadovo Cove on the west coast of Rugged Island in the South Shetland Islands.  The area was visited by early 19th century sealers. It is named after the settlement of Prosechen in Northeastern Bulgaria.

Description
The island is named after the settlement of Prosechen in Northeastern Bulgaria.

Location
Spanish mapping took place in 1992 and Bulgarian mapping in 2009.

See also
 List of Antarctic and subantarctic islands

Maps
 Península Byers, Isla Livingston. Mapa topográfico a escala 1:25000. Madrid: Servicio Geográfico del Ejército, 1992.
 L.L. Ivanov. Antarctica: Livingston Island and Greenwich, Robert, Snow and Smith Islands. Scale 1:120000 topographic map. Troyan: Manfred Wörner Foundation, 2010.  (First edition 2009. )
 Antarctic Digital Database (ADD). Scale 1:250000 topographic map of Antarctica. Scientific Committee on Antarctic Research (SCAR). Since 1993, regularly upgraded and updated.
 L.L. Ivanov. Antarctica: Livingston Island and Smith Island. Scale 1:100000 topographic map. Manfred Wörner Foundation, 2017.

References

External links
 Prosechen Island. Copernix satellite image

Islands of the South Shetland Islands
Bulgaria and the Antarctic